Texas's 33rd congressional district is a district that was created as a result of the 2010 Census. The first candidates ran in the 2012 House elections, and were seated for the 113th United States Congress.`

Texas's 33rd congressional district is composed of two counties in Texas—Dallas County and Tarrant County. In Dallas County, the district covers parts of Dallas, Irving, Grand Prairie, Farmers Branch, Carrollton and all of Cockrell Hill. In Tarrant County, the district includes parts of Arlington, Forest Hill, Fort Worth, Grand Prairie, Haltom City, Saginaw and Sansom Park, and all of Everman.

It is currently represented by Democrat Marc Veasey.

Election results from presidential races

List of member representing the district

Election results

2012 election 

Marc Veasey and Domingo García took the top two spots in the May 29, 2012, Democratic Primary. Veasey won the runoff on July 31 to determine who would face the Republican nominee, Chuck Bradley, in the general election. Veasey won the general election and was seated in the new district.

2014 election

2016 election

2018 election

2020 election

References

33
Constituencies established in 2013
2013 establishments in Texas